The Rhynie chert is a Lower Devonian sedimentary deposit exhibiting extraordinary fossil detail or completeness (a Lagerstätte). It is exposed near the village of Rhynie, Aberdeenshire, Scotland; a second unit, the Windyfield chert, is located some 700 m away. The Rhynie chert contains exceptionally preserved plant, fungus, lichen and animal material preserved in place by an overlying volcanic deposit. The bulk of the Devonian fossil bed consists of primitive plants (which had water-conducting cells and sporangia, but no true leaves), along with arthropods, lichens, algae and fungi.

This fossil bed is remarkable for two reasons. First, the age of the site (Pragian, Early Devonian, formed about ) places it at an early stage in the colonisation of land. Second, these cherts are famous for their exceptional state of ultrastructural preservation, with individual cell walls easily visible in polished specimens. Stomata have been counted and lignin remnants detected in the plant material, and the breathing apparatus of trigonotarbids—of the class Arachnida—(known as book lungs) can be seen in cross-sections. Fungal hyphae can be seen entering plant material, acting as decomposers and mycorrhizal symbionts.

Location
The bed is under at least 1 metre of overburden, in a small field near the village of Rhynie, so is effectively inaccessible to collectors; besides which, the site is a Site of Special Scientific Interest. A second unit, the Windyfield chert, is some 700 m from the Rhynie. The Rhynie chert extends for at least 80 m along strike and 90 m down-dip.

History of research
The chert was discovered by William Mackie while mapping the western margin of the Rhynie basin in 1910–1913. Trenches were cut into the chert at the end of this period, and Robert Kidston and William Henry Lang worked furiously to describe the plant fossils between 1917 and 1921. The arthropods were examined soon afterwards by different workers. Interest in the chert then waned until the field was reinvigorated by Alexander Geoffrey Lyon in the late 1950s, and new material was collected by further trenching from 1963 to 1971. Since 1980, the chert has been examined by the University of Münster, and from 1987 by Aberdeen University, whose researchers confirmed that the chert was indeed produced in a hot spring setting. Cores, allowing an insight into the evolution of the chert over time, were drilled in 1988 and 1997, accompanied by further trenching efforts, which unearthed the Windyfield chert.

Until recently, the Rhynie chert was the only such deposit known from the geological record, although recent work has turned up other localities from different time periods and continents.

Conditions of formation
The chert was formed when silica-rich water from volcanic springs rose rapidly and petrified the early terrestrial ecosystem, in situ and almost instantaneously, in much the same fashion that organisms are petrified by hot springs today - although the astounding fidelity of preservation has not been found in recent deposits. Deposition was very rapid. The fluids originated from a shallowly dipping extensional fault system to the west, which bounded an extensional half-graben.

Fossils were formed as silica formed in the hot springs themselves; when silica-rich water flooded the surrounding areas; and when it permeated into the surrounding soil. The texture of the sinter formed resemble those found today in freshwater streams at Yellowstone which are typically alkaline (pH 8.7) and tepid . The springs were periodically active, and flowed into an alluvial plain containing small lakes. By analogy with Yellowstone, the chert itself probably formed in a marshy area towards the latter end of the extent of outwash from the springs. Living vegetation covered around 55% of the land area, with litter covering 30% and the remaining 15% of the ground being bare.
A braided river flowing to the north periodically deposited the sandy layers found in cores when it flooded its banks.

Sedimentary textures which appear to have formed in the hydrothermal vents themselves are preserved with a brecciated texture; "geyserite", a sediment with a botryoidal form reminiscent of modern vent margins, is also found. Spores collected from within surrounding rocks had been heated to different degrees, implying a complex history of local heating by volcanic processes.

Preservation

Plants

The preservation of plants varies from perfect three-dimensional cellular permineralisation to flattened charcoal films. On occasion, plants may have their vertical axes preserved in growth position, with rhizoids still attached to rhizomes; even the plant litter is preserved.

Plants were only found on the land - none lived in the water of lakes or hot springs. Rhynia typically grew on sandy surfaces, and is often preserved there in life position; Horneophyton grew on sinter, the sediment formed by the hot springs. These two colonisers were subsequently joined by other genera.
The time between sinter deposition events was too short to allow the populations to develop to climax communities, and correspondingly early colonisers appear most frequently, pseudo-randomly, in logged sequences.

Plants demonstrate best the great value of the exceptional preservation of the Rhynie chert. The presence of soft tissue, including parenchyma, is not observed elsewhere in the fossil record until the advent of amber in the Triassic. This allows the study of structures such as the air spaces behind stomata, whereas the conventional record at its best allows no more than the counting of stomata. It has also enabled paleobotanists to firmly deduce that plants such as Aglaophyton were not aquatic, as once believed. Further, as plants are preserved in situ, the study of exactly how and why the branching patterns of the early plants emerged is possible, whereas typical fossils only show that branching was present. The analysis of rhizomes and rhizoids makes it possible to discern which plants had an active water uptake system (e.g. Horneophyton), and which were likely to have colonised waterlogged surfaces (Asteroxylon). In some cases, it is possible to see different mechanisms of repairing wounds, and to deduce that they were caused by fungal or bacterial infection.

The preservation of spores attached to sporangia allows spore genera to be matched with their producers - something that is otherwise very difficult to do. The chert also allows the identification of the gametophyte phases of taxa such as Aglaophyton.

Analysis of spores shows that the flora was lacking in some elements common elsewhere at this time, likely due to its setting in a mountainous region, rather than in a lowland flood plain like most other fossil deposits. However, the spores, which are distinctive enough to permit their producing organism to be identified - are identical to those found elsewhere in "normal" environments. There is no clear-cut evidence that the plants of the Rhynie assemblage were specifically adapted to stressed environments, and it is likely that the flora in fact represents those members of the global fauna that happened to be capable of colonising and surviving a hot spring environment by virtue of fortuitous preadaptations.

Seven land plant taxa have been identified in the Rhynie and Windyfield cherts:

 Aglaophyton
 Asteroxylon
 Horneophyton
 Nothia
 Rhynia
 Trichopherophyton
 Ventarura

Another group, Nematophytes, remains enigmatic, but may represent aquatic land plants.

Algae
Several putative chlorophytes have been discovered in the Rhynie assemblage (Mackiella and Rhynchertia). A well-preserved charophyte, Palaeonitella, which inhabited the alkaline freshwater pools towards the end of the sinter apron, has been characterized.

Arthropods
As a result of its exquisite preservation, the Rhynie chert boasts the most diverse non-marine fauna of its time, and is important for our understanding of arthropod terrestrialisation. Typical members of the Rhynie chert arthropod fauna include the crustacean Lepidocaris, the euthycarcinoid Heterocrania, the springtail Rhyniella, the harvestman Eophalangium sheari, Acari (mites), and trigonotarbids in the genus Palaeocharinus.

The oldest known hexapod (Rhyniella praecursor), which resembles the modern springtails, was found in the Rhynie chert, pushing dates for the origination of hexapods (a group that includes the insects) back to the Silurian period.

Fungi
Fungi known from the Rhynie chert include the chytridiomycetes, ascomycetes, oomycota (Peronosporomycetes) and glomeromycetes; indeed the only fungal groups not yet known from the Rhynie are the Zygomycota (although they may have formed lichens - see later), and the Basidiomycota, the latter of which may not even have evolved by Rhynie time.

The Chytridiomycetes, or Chytrids, are a basal group of fungi, closely related to the true fungi.

The chytrids display a range of behaviour in the Rhynie chert. Eucarpic and holocarpic forms are known - i.e. some forms grew specialised fruiting bodies while others did not show specialisation in this fashion. Saprotrophy may be present, and parasitism is common; one individual has even been found parasitising a germinating gametophyte. The fungi were aquatic, and grew in both plants and algae; they are also found preserved "loose" in the chert matrix. Their flagellate spores are preserved.

The largest organism present in Rhynie was probably a fungus, the enigmatic Prototaxites, growing as a mound a metre or more taller than anything in the community, whose isotopic composition varied like a saprotroph and whose septate pores resemble those of fungi.

Cyanobacteria
In the rare instances that cyanobacteria are found in the fossil record, their presence is usually the subject of much controversy, for their simple form is difficult to distinguish from inorganic structures such as bubbles.

However, bona fide cyanobacteria are preserved in the Rhynie chert. The aquatic organisms are thought to belong to the Oscillatoriales section on the basis of biomarker absence. The fossils are filamentous, around 3 μm in diameter, and grew on plants and the sediment itself. They occasionally form structured colonies which go on to create microbial mats.

Lichens
A new genus of lichen, Winfrenatia, has been recovered from the Rhynie chert. The lichen comprises a thallus, made of layered, aseptate hyphae; a number of depressions are formed on its top surface. Each depression contains a net of hyphae holding a sheathed cyanobacterium. The fungus appears to be related to the Zygomycetes, and the photobiont resembles the coccoid Gloeocapsa and Chroococcidiopsis.

Interactions
The Rhynie chert, by preserving a snapshot of an ecosystem in situ in high fidelity, gives a unique opportunity to observe interactions between species and kingdoms. There is evidence of parasitic behaviour by fungi on algae Palaeonitella, provoking a hypertrophic response. Herbivory is also evident, judging by boring and piercing wounds in various states of repair, and the mouthparts of arthropods.

Coprolites - fossilised droppings - give a useful insight of what animals ate, even if the animals cannot be identified. Coprolites found in the Rhynie chert are typically between 0.5 and 3 mm in size, and contain a variety of contents. Analysis of coprolites allows the identification of different feeding modes, including detritovory and herbivory; some coprolites are so densely packed with spores that it is possible that these made up a substantial proportion of some organisms' diets. The trigonotarbid species found in the deposit were predators: it is possible for many of the arthropods to deduce their likely ecological role, however, it is unclear if this community was representative of a typical terrestrial arthropod community of the time, or rather was specific to the stressed Rhynie environment.

Plants responded to fungal colonisation in different ways, depending on the fungus. The rhizoids of Nothia displayed three responses to fungal infestation: the hyphae of some (mutualistic) colonists were encased by plant cell walls; other (parasitic) fungi were met with typical host responses of increased rhizome cell size; while yet other fungi solicited an increase in thickness and pigmentation of cell walls. Once inside a plant cell, fungi produced spores, which are found in decaying plant cells; the cells may have decayed as a defence mechanism to prevent the fungi from spreading.

Fungal interactions are known to promote speciation in modern plants, and presumably also affected Devonian diversity by providing a selection pressure.

Mycorrhizae are also found in the Rhynie chert.

See also
 Evolutionary history of plants
 Geology of Scotland

References

Further reading

External links
 

1910 in paleontology
1910 in Scotland
Protected areas of Aberdeenshire
Devonian System of Europe
Chert
Lower Devonian Series
Lagerstätten
Environment of Aberdeenshire
Paleontology in Scotland